Almost Seventeen is Crystal Kay's third album. It is her second R&B dominant album and is produced by a similar team as worked on 637: Always and forever. A large part of the record was written and produced by Michico and T-Kura of Giant Swing Productions. She also worked with the TinyVoice production company and Takahashi Taku from m-flo to produce "Hard to say". "Love Of A Lifetime" is a cover of a 1999 single by British girl group Honeyz. Crystal also released her ninth single "Girl U Love" alongside the album. The first pressings of Almost Seventeen were released at a lower price, and later prints received a new catalog number and a raised price.

The album reached #2 on the weekly Oricon chart. This was a huge career milestone for Crystal, with her last album peaking at #19. In 2003 almost seventeen sold 213,023 copies, making it the #62 best selling album of the year. In all the record ranked for a total of 58 weeks, selling 354,910 copies. It is Crystal's best selling album.

Track listing

Charts

Release history

References

External links 
 Crystal Kay — official website

2002 albums
Crystal Kay albums
Epic Records albums